Forced displacement and the experiences of refugees, asylum seekers and otherwise forcibly displaced people became of increasing interest in the popular culture since 2015 with the European migrant crisis.

Books

Fiction

 Refugee Tales: Volume II: 2 by Jackie Kay et al., 2017
 Exit West by Mohsin Hamid, 2017
 Refugee Tales, by Ali Smith et al., 2016
 What Is the What by Dave Eggers, 2006
 Refugee Boy by Benjamin Zephaniah, 2001

Children's books
 Where Will I Live? by Rosemary McCarney, 2017
 Stormy Seas. Stories of Young Boat Refugees by   Mary Beth Leatherdale, 2017
 Stepping Stones. A Refugee Family's Journey by Margriet Ruurs, 2016
 Refugee by Alan Gratz, 2016

Poems

 Sisters' Entrance by Emtithal Mahmoud, 2018

Non-Fiction

 The New Odyssey: The Story of Europe's Refugee Crisis by Patrick Kingsley, 2017
 Cast Away: Stories of Survival from Europe's Refugee Crisis by Charlotte McDonald-Gibson, 2017
 Refuge: Transforming a Broken Refugee System by Alexander Betts and Paul Collier, 2017
 Violent Borders: Refugees and the Right to Move by Reece Jones, 2017
 A Hope More Powerful Than the Sea by Melissa Fleming, 2017
 Refugee Stories: Seven personal journeys behind the headlines by Dave Smith, 2016
 City of Thorns: Nine Lives in the World's Largest Refugee Camp by Ben Rawlence, 2016
 The Morning They Came for Us: Dispatches from Syria by Janine di Giovanni, 2016
 Refugee Economies: Forced Displacement and Development by Alexander Betts et al., 2016
 The Making of the Modern Refugee by Peter Gatrell, 2015
 The Lightless Sky: My Journey to Safety as a Child Refugee, by Gulwali Passarlay, 2015
 Human Cargo: A Journey Among Refugees by Caroline Moorehead, 2006
 They Poured Fire on Us From the Sky by Judy A. Bernstein, 2005, is the story three of the Lost Boys of Sudan
 Escape From Manus, 2021 autobiography by Jaivet Ealom

Film

Drama

 The Other Side of Hope by Aki Kaurismäki, 2017
 Pawo by  Marvin Litwak, 2016
 Mediterranea by Jonas Carpignano, 2015
 Ohthes by Panos Karkanevatos, 2015
  Hope by Boris Lojkine, 2014
 The Golden Dream by Diego Quemada-Díez, 2013
 Le Havre by Aki Kaurismäki, 2011
 In This World by Michael Winterbottom, 2002
 Baran by Majid Majidi, 2001
 Last Resort by Paweł Pawlikowski, 2000

Fantasy
 Encanto by Jared Bush and Byron Howard, 2021

Documentary

 Island of the Hungry Ghosts by Gabrielle Brady, 2018
 Stop the boats by Simon V. Kurian, 2018
 Watan by James L. Brown and Bill Irving, 2018
 Human Flow by Ai Weiwei, 2017
 Warehoused: The forgotten refugees of Dadaab by Asher Emmanuel and Vincent Vittorio, 2017
 Refugee by Alexander J. Farrell, 2017
 Re-Calais by Yann Moix, 2017
 69 Minutes of 86 Days by Egil Håskjold Larsen, 2017
 Hope Road by Tom Zubrycki, 2017
 Sea Sorrow by Vanessa Redgrave, 2017
 8 Borders, 8 Days by Amanda Bailly, 2017
 Fire at Sea by Gianfranco Rosi, 2016
 Ta'ang by Wang Bing, 2016
 4.1 Miles by Daphne Matziaraki, 2016
 Influx by Luca Vullo, 2016
 The Art of Moving by Liliana Dulce Marinho de Sousa, 2016
 Between Fences by Avi Mograbi, 2016
 Stranger in Paradise by Guido Hendrikx, 2016
 Rifles or Graffiti by Jordi Oriola Folch, 2016
 Born in Syria by Hernán Zin, 2016
 The Invisible City: Kakuma by Lieven Corthouts, 2016
 Salam Neighbor by Chris Temple and Zach Ingrasci, 2015
 Beats of the Antonov by Hajooj Kuka, 2014
 On The Bride's Side by Antonio Augugliaro et al., 2014
 Moving to Mars by Mat Whitecross, 2009
 Lost Boys of Sudan by Megan Mylan and Jon Shenk, 2003

Short film
 I am Rebecca by Eve Doherty and Kate McCaslin, 2017
 I felt it too by Iamia Aboukheir, 2017
 Only My Voice by Myriam Rey, 2017
 Refugee by Joyce Chen and Emily Moore, 2016
 Refugee by Adam Tyler, 2016
 Lifestories: The Lost Boys of Sudan by J.D. Martin, 2008

TV series

 Exodus: Our Journey was shown on BBC Two in 2017. It started with 3 episodes called Exodus: Our Journey to Europe and was followed by 3 episodes called Exodus: Our Journey Continues

Theatre

 The Claim by Tim Cowbury and Mark Maughan, 2017
 The Jungle by Joe Murphy and Joe Robertson, 2017
 Fireworks by Dalia Taha and Richard Twyman, 2015
 Refugee Boy by Lemn Sissay, 2013
 Refugees by Zlatko Topčić, 1999

Painting 

 Refugees by Jēkabs Kazaks, 1917

See also

 Asylum seekers
Lost Boys of Sudan#Books, films and plays
Refugees
Refugee employment

References

Refugees